Blasted is a shoot 'em up arcade video game released by Bally Midway in 1988.

Gameplay 
Players use the high-powered scope-rifle to shoot cyborgs who have invaded an apartment complex, but be careful not to shoot the tenants or get hit by return fire. In 2-player mode, you shoot at your opponent's building and he shoots at yours.

Development 
Originally, this game was a 4 player shooter known as International Team Laser, an attempt to capitalize on the laser tag craze of the late 1980s. However, the game was canned, and its gameplay elements were re-themed to create Blasted, which included reducing the number of players from 4 to 2.

References 

1988 video games
Arcade video games
Arcade-only video games
Midway video games
Shoot 'em ups
Video games developed in the United States